Aitor Casas Luceño (born 29 June 1992) is a Spanish retired footballer who played as a left back.

Club career
Born in Reus, Tarragona, Catalonia, Casas joined Gimnàstic de Tarragona's youth setup after a short stint with AE Pare Manyanet. On 19 June 2010, while still a junior, he played his first match as a professional, coming on as a late substitute in a 0–1 loss at Las Palmas in the Segunda División championship. It was his maiden appearance in the competition, however.

In the 2010 summer, Casas was assigned to CF Pobla de Mafumet, the club's farm team. On 29 January 2014, he left Nàstic, and joined CE Sabadell FC's reserves on 12 February. However, a week later he left the club, alleging "personal problems".

On 23 June 2014, Casas signed for FC Vilafranca, in Tercera División. He left the club in 2016, and subsequently retired from professional football.

References

External links

Futbolme profile 

1992 births
Living people
People from Reus
Sportspeople from the Province of Tarragona
Spanish footballers
Footballers from Catalonia
Association football defenders
Segunda División players
Tercera División players
Gimnàstic de Tarragona footballers
CF Pobla de Mafumet footballers
CE Sabadell FC B players